Desmona is a genus of northern caddisflies in the family Limnephilidae. There are at least two described species in Desmona.

Species
These two species belong to the genus Desmona:
 Desmona bethula Denning, 1954 (amphibious caddisfly)
 Desmona mono (Denning, 1970)

References

Further reading

 
 
 

Trichoptera genera
Articles created by Qbugbot
Integripalpia